A boil is a localized accumulation of pus in the skin, resulting from infection of the hair follicle.

Boil or The Boil or The Boils may also refer to:

Music
Boil (album), a 1996 album by Foetus
The Boils, an American band

Places
Boil, Bulgaria
The Boil, a snow eminence on Reeves Neve, Victoria Land, New Zealand

Other uses
Boiling, bringing a liquid to its boiling point
Shuizhu, a Sichuan Chinese dish also known as "water cooked" or "boil cuisine"

See also
Boyle (disambiguation)